Gregor Balažic (born 12 February 1988) is a Slovenian professional footballer who plays as a central defender for Slovenian PrvaLiga club Mura.

In Slovenia, he played for Mura and Gorica. He had spells abroad in Spain, Ukraine, Serbia, Russia and Cyprus, notably having a five-year spell with Karpaty Lviv in the Ukrainian Premier League and winning the 2014–15 Serbian SuperLiga with Partizan.

Balažic represented Slovenia at all youth levels, and made his senior debut in 2013.

Club career

Early career
Born in Murska Sobota, Balažic came through the youth academy of Mura, who went defunct in 2005. He made his first-team debut at the age of 17 in a 2–1 home league win against Zagorje on 30 April 2005, during the club's last competitive season.

In the summer of 2005, Balažic was transferred to Benfica of Portugal. Until his departure two years later, he played exclusively for their youth sides.

Spain
In June 2007, Balažic moved to Spain and signed with Espanyol, being initially registered for the reserves. However, two months later, he left for Águilas also in the country's Segunda División B.

Balažic suffered a knee injury early into the campaign, which resulted in the termination of his contract in December 2007.

Gorica
In the winter transfer window of 2008, Balažic returned to his country and signed for Gorica of the Slovenian PrvaLiga. He scored his first goal as a senior on 5 December 2009, helping to a 1–1 home draw against Olimpija Ljubljana.

Balažic contributed with 29 games in 2009–10, helping his team to finish third and qualify for the UEFA Europa League.

Karpaty Lviv
In January 2011, Balažic signed with Karpaty Lviv in the Ukrainian Premier League, penning a four-year deal for €400,000 in what was the club's most expensive transfer ever. On 6 March he made his competitive debut, netting in a 2–2 draw at Arsenal Kyiv.

In the first round of 2014–15, Balažic scored in a 2–2 away draw to Hoverla Uzhhorod. He scored a career-best four goals during that season, in only 13 matches.

Partizan
On 4 February 2015, Balažic signed a two-year contract with Partizan. On 28 February he made his first appearance, featuring the full 90 minutes in a 0–0 home draw against Radnički Niš.

On 25 April 2015, during the Eternal derby against Red Star Belgrade, Balažic was fouled in the area by Vukašin Jovanović in what should have been a penalty for Partizan, but referee Milorad Mažić did not concede it. A week later, against Vojvodina, this time it was Balažic who brought down an opponent but, again, nothing was awarded; later, he admitted he did commit the infraction.

During his debut campaign, Balažic partnered his compatriot Branko Ilić as a central defender. After the departure of the latter in the summer, he started alongside Brazilian Fabrício. He scored his first official goal for the team on 22 August 2015, helping to a 3–1 away victory over Borac Čačak.

Ural
On 30 December 2016, Balažic signed for two and a half years with Russian Premier League club Ural Yekaterinburg. On 7 June 2019, he left upon the expiration of his contract.

International career
Balažic made his senior debut for Slovenia on 19 November 2013, in a 1–0 friendly win against Canada in Celje. His second cap came on 7 June of the following year in another friendly, a 2–0 loss to Argentina in La Plata.

Style of play
Balažic is a quick and strong player, technically gifted and with passing ability. Oleg Kononov, his coach at Karpaty, described him as a "very intelligent player" with a "great potential".

Career statistics

Club

International

Honours
Partizan
Serbian SuperLiga: 2014–15
Serbian Cup: 2015–16

References

External links

 NZS profile 
 
 
 
 

1988 births
Living people
People from Murska Sobota
Prekmurje Slovenes
Slovenian footballers
Slovenia youth international footballers
Slovenia under-21 international footballers
Slovenia international footballers
Association football defenders
NK Mura players
ND Gorica players
RCD Espanyol B footballers
FC Karpaty Lviv players
FK Partizan players
FC Ural Yekaterinburg players
Enosis Neon Paralimni FC players
NŠ Mura players
Slovenian PrvaLiga players
Segunda División B players
Ukrainian Premier League players
Serbian SuperLiga players
Russian Premier League players
Cypriot First Division  players
Slovenian expatriate footballers
Expatriate footballers in Portugal
Expatriate footballers in Spain
Expatriate footballers in Ukraine
Expatriate footballers in Serbia
Expatriate footballers in Russia
Expatriate footballers in Cyprus
Slovenian expatriate sportspeople in Portugal
Slovenian expatriate sportspeople in Spain
Slovenian expatriate sportspeople in Ukraine
Slovenian expatriate sportspeople in Serbia
Slovenian expatriate sportspeople in Russia
Slovenian expatriate sportspeople in Cyprus